Saugeen 29 is a First Nations reserve in Bruce County, Ontario. It is the main reserve of the Saugeen First Nation.

Like Chief's Point 28, this band owns land that is rented to cottagers who pay an annual lease fee for the use of the land. The current (mid 2019) lease contract between the cottagers and the two Reserves is in effect until 30 April 2021.

Some years ago, the Saugeen First Nation successfully reclaimed the land that "runs south from the Sauble Beach sign toward Southampton, 18 kilometres away", according to one news report. The beach area to the south of Main St. in the community is referred to by the band as Sauble Park or South Sauble Beach Park. In addition to the south Sauble Beach, Ontario area, the Saugeen First Nation claims the rights to another stretch of the public beach, approximately 2 km long, west of Lakeshore Boulevard extending to a point between 1st St. South and 6th St. North. This claim has been in litigation since 1990 when the federal government started an action on behalf of the Saugeen First Nation, stating that the area is part of the Saugeen 29 Reserve. The band also filed its own claim in 1995.

Demographics

References

Ojibwe reserves in Ontario
Communities in Bruce County
Unceded territories in Ontario
Saugeen First Nation